Daniela Hantuchová and Agnieszka Radwańska were the defending champions but were eliminated in the second round by Vera Dushevina and Shahar Pe'er.
Maria Kirilenko and Nadia Petrova defeated Sara Errani and Roberta Vinci 7–6(7–0), 4–6, [10–4] in the final to win the title.

Seeds

Draw

Finals

Top half

Bottom half

References
Main Draw

Sony Ericsson Open - Women's Doubles
2012 Sony Ericsson Open
Women in Florida